The Embassy of Russia in Tbilisi was the diplomatic mission of the Russian Federation to the Republic of Georgia. The chancery was located at 51 Chavchavadze Avenue in Tbilisi. On August 29, 2008, Georgia ordered the Russian ambassador Vyacheslav Kovalenko and all other Russian diplomats to leave the country and close the embassy and severed diplomatic relations with Russia. Russia and Georgia had previously fought a five-day war over two Georgian breakaway regions (Abkhazia and South Ossetia) declaring independence. The Russian Federation is represented through the Russian Federation Interests Section of the Embassy of Switzerland in Georgia.

See also  
 Georgia–Russia relations

References

External links 

 Embassy of Switzerland in Georgia, Russian Federation Interests Section 

Georgia (country)–Russia relations
Russia
Tbilisi
Georgia (country)–Switzerland relations
Russia–Switzerland relations
Vake, Tbilisi